Ross J. Thompson (born June 2, 1973) is an American retired professional boxer from Buffalo, New York.
In 1991 he won the national golden gloves and the us Olympic festival 
Thompson was a 5x national champion as an amateur who underachieved as a professional 
In 1996 he won the naba welterweight title 
In 1999 he won the wba North American jr middleweight title

In 2000, he lost to Fernando Vargas for the International Boxing Federation super welterweight title.

In 2001, he lost to Eric Mitchell for the North American Boxing Association middleweight title.

In 2002 he won the wbc continental americas title at super middleweight
 
In 2002, he lost to future world champion Jeff Lacy.
In 2002 he won the wbc continental americas title at super middleweight

In 2004, he lost to both Kelly Pavlik and Antwun Echols.

References

External links
 

1973 births
Living people
American male boxers
Middleweight boxers